Kyle Erickson Saxelid (born April 13, 1995) is a Canadian football offensive lineman for the Hamilton Tiger-Cats of the Canadian Football League (CFL).

College 
Saxelid played for the University of Nevada Las Vegas, graduating in 2017 with a degree in Business. He played in 48 consecutive games for the Rebels, starting the last 42. He was named preseason Fourth Team All-MW by Athlon his Junior and Senior seasons. Saxelid earned three Academic All-Mountain West Conference honors and was nominated for a spot on the 2016 AFCA Good Works Team.

Professional

Indoor Football League 
Saxelid began his professional football career in 2018 playing for the Nebraska Danger of the Indoor Football League The following year, he signed with the Rapid City River Kings of the same league, playing with fellow UNLV teammate Kurt Palandech.

Edmonton Eskimos / Elks 
In May 2019, Saxelid was drafted in the second round (12th overall) of the 2019 CFL Draft by the Edmonton Eskimos. He participated in all 18 games in his rookie season, starting a total of six games over the season (one at right guard, five at left tackle), including the Eastern Conference Final. He did not play in 2020 due to the cancellation of the 2020 CFL season. He played in 11 regular season games in 2021.

Hamilton Tiger-Cats 
On May 2, 2022, Saxelid was traded to the Hamilton Tiger-Cats along with Grant McDonald and the second overall selection in the 2022 CFL Global Draft in exchange for the eighth and 28th overall selections in the 2022 CFL National Draft and the ninth overall selection in the 2022 CFL Global Draft.

References

External links 
Hamilton Tiger-Cats bio

1995 births
Living people
American football offensive linemen
Canadian football offensive linemen
Canadian players of American football
Edmonton Elks players
Hamilton Tiger-Cats players
UNLV Rebels football players
Sportspeople from Elk Grove, California